Infinito is the sixth album by the band Fresno. The album was released digitally November 1, 2012. It was released physically on November 23. The album has 11 tracks, and is approximately 45 minutes long. The first single was "Infinito" and its video was released on July 17, 2012. The album is available in its entirety on the band's YouTube channel.

References

External links

2012 albums
Fresno (band) albums